Carlos Manuel Correia dos Santos (born 15 January 1958), known as Carlos Manuel, is a Portuguese retired professional footballer who played as a central midfielder, and a manager.

Best known for his spell at Benfica, for which he appeared in 318 competitive matches over eight and a half seasons, scoring 58 goals. He was also a leading figure for the national team during the better part of the 1980s and, after retiring, he embarked on a lengthy spell as coach.

Having won more than 40 caps for Portugal in six years, Carlos Manuel represented the nation in one World Cup and one European Championship.

Club career
Born in Moita, Setúbal District, Carlos Manuel made his senior debut with G.D. CUF, moving in 1978 to F.C. Barreirense. He reached the Primeira Liga as he signed with S.L. Benfica, still in Lisbon, going on to be an influential member of a side that won four leagues and six cups in the 80s, as well as finishing runners-up to R.S.C. Anderlecht in the 1982–83 UEFA Cup.

After falling out of favour with the club's management, Carlos Manuel moved in January 1988 to Switzerland with FC Sion. Only five months later, he returned to the Portuguese capital after signing with Sporting CP. After a solid first season his career began winding down, and he finally retired at the end of 1993–94 whilst at G.D. Estoril Praia – he had previously represented Boavista F.C. for two years; he was chosen by Portuguese sports newspaper Record as one of the best 100 Portuguese football players ever.

After retiring at 36, Carlos Manuel took up coaching, having managed with little success a host of clubs, mainly in the Lisbon area. Midway through the 1997–98 campaign, he bought out his contract at S.C. Salgueiros and joined Sporting, but the latter could only finish fourth and he was dismissed, a fate he met mere months after at S.C. Braga.

International career
For the Portugal national team, Carlos Manuel was capped on 42 occasions, scoring eight goals. His debut came on 26 March 1980 in a 1–4 away loss against Scotland for the UEFA Euro 1980 qualifiers.

Three of those goals were memorable: the win over Poland in Wrocław on 28 October 1983 which helped Portugal qualify for Euro 1984, the historic victory in West Germany on 16 October 1985, which secured qualification for the 1986 FIFA World Cup, and in the latter competition's final stages, the defeat of England in the group opener (all three matches finished 1–0 for Portugal).

After the 1986 World Cup loss to Morocco, with the national side being ousted in the group stages – the competition was also stained by the Portuguese players' involvement in the Saltillo Affair – Carlos Manuel retired from the international scene, at only 28. In June 2012, he succeeded Luís Norton de Matos as manager of Guinea-Bissau. He was in charge for one match, a 1–0 loss away to Cameroon in the 2013 Africa Cup of Nations qualifying stage (2–0 aggregate).

|}

Honours

Club
Benfica
Primeira Liga: 1980–81, 1982–83, 1983–84, 1986–87
Taça de Portugal: 1979–80, 1980–81, 1982–83, 1984–85, 1985–86, 1986–87
Supertaça Cândido de Oliveira: 1979, 1984
Taça de Honra (2)
UEFA Cup runner-up: 1982–83

Boavista
Taça de Portugal: 1991–92

Individual
CNID Footballer of the Year: 1985

References

External links
 
 
 
 
 
 Carlos Manuel Interview

1958 births
Living people
People from Moita
Portuguese footballers
Association football midfielders
Primeira Liga players
Liga Portugal 2 players
G.D. Fabril players
F.C. Barreirense players
S.L. Benfica footballers
Sporting CP footballers
Boavista F.C. players
G.D. Estoril Praia players
Swiss Super League players
FC Sion players
Portugal under-21 international footballers
Portugal international footballers
UEFA Euro 1984 players
1986 FIFA World Cup players
Portuguese expatriate footballers
Expatriate footballers in Switzerland
Portuguese expatriate sportspeople in Switzerland
Portuguese football managers
Primeira Liga managers
Liga Portugal 2 managers
G.D. Estoril Praia managers
Sporting CP managers
S.C. Braga managers
S.C. Campomaiorense managers
C.D. Santa Clara managers
Atlético Clube de Portugal managers
C.D. Primeiro de Agosto managers
Sanat Naft Abadan F.C. managers
Guinea-Bissau national football team managers
Portuguese expatriate football managers
Expatriate football managers in Angola
Expatriate football managers in Guinea-Bissau
Expatriate football managers in Iran
Portuguese expatriate sportspeople in Angola
Portuguese expatriate sportspeople in Guinea-Bissau
Portuguese expatriate sportspeople in Iran
Sportspeople from Setúbal District